Louis-Henri-Frédéric Melsens (July 11, 1814 in Leuven – April 20, 1886 in Brussels) was a Belgian physicist and chemist. In 1846, he became professor of chemistry at the Royal Veterinary School of Cureghem in Anderlecht, Brussels. Melsens applied the principle of the Faraday cage to lightning conductors and invented tincture of iodine for disinfection. Though not a medical doctor himself, in medical circles of the late nineteenth and early twentieth centuries he was internationally famous for his research on and promoting the use of oral administration of potassium iodide as a cure for lead or mercury poisoning.

Life and career
Born in Leuven on July 11, 1814, Melsens was first home-schooled by his mother. He then went on to high school in Leuven. He studied ancient languages, as well as English, German and Italian, and began his career in the offices of a commercial firm in Antwerp, with the Josson brothers. Not really having a commercial streak, he decided to devote the rest his life to the study of science. On the advice of his mother and his fellow student Jean Servais Stas, he went to Paris to study chemistry and physics in Jean-Baptiste Dumas' private laboratory. He shared an apartment with Stas.

He completed his training in Bonn, Germany, where he attended Liebig's laboratory. He became a doctor of science at the University of Giessen.

Back in Belgium, he obtained the chair of physics and chemistry at the Royal Veterinary School of Cureghem and permanent examiner at the Belgian Royal Military Academy. He was appointed correspondent of the Royal Academy of Belgium, on December 16, 1846 and became a member of the institution on December 15, 1850. He was director of the Classe des sciences in 1859.

Melsens suffered from poor health throughout his life, and died at the age of 71 on April 20, 1886 in Brussels. He is buried in Evere.

Scientific achievements
Melsens mainly did research in organic chemistry, although he also pioneered uses of inorganic iodine in medicine. As early as 1843, he collaborated with Natalis Guillot on the curative properties of potassium iodide administered to people suffering from lead or mercury poisoning, for which in 1877 he was awarded the Guinard Prize by the Royal Academy of Belgium, given to the scientist who has written the best work or created the best invention to improve the material or intellectual position of the working class. He also received the Montyon Prize by the Paris Academy of Sciences in 1865.

He also carried out research on lightning rods and invented an improved version of Benjamin Franklin's original design.

Streets and scientific award named in his honor
The Louis Melsens Prize is awarded to a Belgian or naturalised Belgian author of the most remarkable work on applied chemistry or physics. The Melsensstraat or Rue Melsens in Brussels and the Louis Melsensstraat in Leuven are streets named after him.

References

Sources
 Louis Melsens on bestor.be (French)
 Le paratonnerre à cage métallique de Louis Melsens (French)
 D. Thorburn Burns and Hendrik Deelstra, Analytical chemistry in Belgium: an historical overview, Microchimica Acta, Volume 161, Numbers 1–2, April 2008, pp. 41–66
 Melsens street

Further reading
 Melsens' legacy by Jaime Wisniaky

Ballistics experts
Belgian physicists
Belgian pharmacologists
1886 deaths
1814 births
Belgian chemists
19th-century Belgian scientists